Maria Török-Duca (née Török; born 25 January 1959), formerly known as Maria Verigeanu, is a Romanian professional handball manager and former player. She is regarded by some as the greatest Romanian playmaker of all time. 

In 2010, she was given the award of Cetățean de onoare ("Honorary Citizen") of the city of Râmnicu Vâlcea (where she resides).

Trophies 
Liga Națională:
Winner: 1979, 1980, 1982, 1989, 1990, 1994

Cupa României:
Winner: 1980, 1982, 1984, 1990, 1994

División de Honor:
Winner: 1990, 1991

Copa de la Reina:
Winner: 1990, 1991

IHF Cup:
Winner: 1984, 1989

IHF Super Cup:
Winner: 1984

References

 
  
1959 births
Living people
People from Sfântu Gheorghe
Romanian handball coaches
Romanian female handball players 
SCM Râmnicu Vâlcea (handball) players
Expatriate handball players 
Romanian expatriate sportspeople in Spain
Romanian people of Hungarian descent